Brian J. Holt (born November 14, 1988) is an American soccer player.

Career

College
Holt played college soccer at Creighton University between 2008 and 2011. In 2011, Holt won numerous awards, including College Cup All-Tournament Team, NSCAA All-America First-Team, NSCAA Midwest Region First-Team, Lowe’s Senior CLASS Award Recipient, MAC Hermann, College Soccer News All-America First-Team, Capital One CoSIDA Academic All-America of the Year, Capital One CoSIDA Academic All-America First-Team, Capital One CoSIDA Academic All-Region VII First-Team, MVC Goalkeeper of the Year, First-Team All-MVC, MVC Tournament MVP and MVC Scholar-Athlete First Team.

Holt also played for USL Premier Development League club Reading United AC in 2011.

Professional
Holt signed with USL Pro club Harrisburg City Islanders in May 2012.

On February 3, 2014 Holt signed with MLS club Philadelphia Union.

On March 9, 2015 Holt signed with the New York Cosmos of the North American Soccer League. He was re-signed by the Cosmos on January 4, 2016.

On April 2, 2018, Holt joined the Jacksonville Armada of the National Premier Soccer League.

On 29 April 2019, Holt signed with Louisville City FC.

References

External links
 
 Brian Holt at Creighton Bluejays
 Brian Holt at New York Cosmos

1988 births
Living people
All-American men's college soccer players
American soccer players
Association football goalkeepers
Creighton Bluejays men's soccer players
Louisville City FC players
New York Cosmos (2010) players
North American Soccer League players
Penn FC players
Philadelphia Union players
Reading United A.C. players
Soccer players from Nebraska
Sportspeople from Omaha, Nebraska
Union Omaha players
USL Championship players
USL League Two players